Emilio Alvarez is the name of:

Emilio Álvarez Icaza (born 1965), president of the Human Rights Commission of the Mexican Federal District
Emilio Álvarez Lejarza (1884–1969), Nicaraguan jurist and political writer
Emilio Álvarez Montalván (1919–2014), Nicaraguan doctor and political writer
Emilio Benfele Álvarez (born 1972), Spanish tennis player
Emilio Álvarez (Uruguayan footballer) (1939–2010), Uruguayan soccer player
Emilio Aragón Álvarez (born 1959), Spanish director, musician, actor, presenter and producer
Emilio Álvarez (Spanish footballer) (born 1971), Spanish football coach, former goalkeeper
Emilio Alvarez (bishop), bishop of the Union of Charismatic Orthodox Churches

See also 
Emilio (given name)